Action Packed Adventure! also known as Action Packed Adventure! (Original Motion Picture Soundtrack) is the debut concept album by the rap group Yaggfu Front. This album has been compared to the Pharcyde & Das EFX for its quirky and somewhat playful lyrics. It was critically acclaimed in the underground hip hop scene but did lukewarm commercially, selling over 200,000 copies.

Track listing

References

1993 debut albums
Mercury Records albums
Concept albums
Yaggfu Front albums